ESDC may refer to:

 Empire State Development Corporation
 Employment and Social Development Canada
 Eurasian Schools Debating Championships
 European Security and Defence College